Tanzhou or Tan Prefecture was a zhou (prefecture) in imperial China centering on modern Changsha, Hunan, China. In the Yuan dynasty it was known as Tanzhou Route and in the Ming dynasty as Tanzhou Prefecture. It existed (intermittently) from 589 to 1372.

Geography
The administrative region of Tanzhou in the Tang dynasty falls within modern eastern Hunan. It probably includes modern:
Under the administration of Changsha:
Changsha
Liuyang
Changsha County
Ningxiang
Under the administration of Zhuzhou:
Zhuzhou
Zhuzhou County
Liling
Under the administration of Xiangtan:
Xiangtan 
Xiangxiang
Xiangtan County
Under the administration of Yiyang:
Yiyang

References
 

Prefectures of the Sui dynasty
Prefectures of the Tang dynasty
Jinghu South Circuit
Prefectures of the Yuan dynasty
Prefectures of the Ming dynasty
Former prefectures in Hunan